Maderentulus is a genus of proturans in the family Acerentomidae.

Species
 Maderentulus maderensis (Condé, 1957)

References

Protura